Kerry Martin Boagni (born September 24, 1964) is an American former professional basketball player. A native of California, he played college basketball for the Cal State Fullerton Titans before being drafted by the Utah Jazz in the 1986 NBA draft. He then began a very successful career in New Zealand, playing the majority of his years for the Wellington Saints.

Early life
Boagni was born in Los Angeles, California. He attended Serra High School in Gardena, California, where he played basketball. A star forward, Boagni averaged 24 points and 17 rebounds per game and shot 61% from the floor. He was named to the 1982 Sporting News' Top 10 prep list, the USA Men's U.S. Olympic Festival Roster, and made more than a half dozen All-America teams. Boagni played in the 1982 McDonald's All-American Boys Game, along with future NBA stars Dell Curry and Kenny Walker.

College career
A highly regarded recruit, Boagni selected the University of Kansas to pursue his basketball career. In his freshman year, he was the team's No. 2 scorer (14 points per game), scored in double figures 23 times, and was named to the Big Eight Conference all-freshman team. After playing 10 games for Kansas in his sophomore year, Boagni transferred to California State University, Fullerton and excelled. The Utah Jazz subsequently picked Boagni with the 105th overall draft pick in the 1986 NBA draft.

Professional career
Boagni landed in New Zealand in 1988 where he began a successful NBL career with the Wellington Saints. Boagni and fellow American Kenny McFadden became club legends as they helped the Saints win the 1988 championship and both earned All-Star Five honors. Boagni played five seasons for the Saints, departing the club for the Hawke's Bay Hawks in 1993. Between 1993 and 1998, Boagni played for the Hawks, had a second stint with the Saints, and had one season with the North Harbour Kings. In 267 career NBL games, Boagni recorded 6,929 points (ranked second all-time) and 1,870 rebounds (ranked ninth all-time). Then in 1999, he helped the North Otago Penguins win the Conference Basketball League championship.

Personal
Boagni's ex-partner, Jane McMeeken, was a former captain of the New Zealand women's national basketball team. His daughter, Tessa, has played in the Women's Basketball Championship, the top women's basketball competition in New Zealand.

References

External links
HoopZone.net profile

1964 births
Living people
African-American basketball players
American expatriate basketball people in New Zealand
American men's basketball players
Basketball players from California
Cal State Fullerton Titans men's basketball players
Forwards (basketball)
Hawke's Bay Hawks players
Kansas Jayhawks men's basketball players
McDonald's High School All-Americans
Parade High School All-Americans (boys' basketball)
Utah Jazz draft picks
Wellington Saints players
21st-century African-American people
20th-century African-American sportspeople